The Samsung Galaxy A12 is an Android smartphone manufactured by Samsung Electronics. The phone was announced in November 2020 as a  successor to the Samsung Galaxy A11. The phone has a quad-camera setup with a 48 MP main camera and a  HD+ Infinity-V display. The Li-Po battery has 5000 mAh, which is 62% bigger than the battery of the iPhone 13 Pro. It ships with Android 10 and now can be updated to Android 12.

The Samsung Galaxy A12 was not available in the United States until April 2021.  The Galaxy A12 available in the U.S. has 3 GB RAM and a 16 MP main camera rather than the 48 MP unit.

Samsung launched Galaxy A12 at €179 for the 3 GB RAM + 32 GB internal storage variant and goes up to €199 for the 6 GB RAM + 128 GB internal storage variant. It is available four colour variants which are Black, White, Blue, and Red.

Samsung launched Galaxy A12 smartphone in India on February 16, 2021, at a price of Rs. 12,999 for the 4 GB RAM + 64 GB internal storage model, while the 4 GB RAM + 128 GB internal storage variant carries a price tag of Rs. 13,999. On 12 August 2021, Samsung relaunched the phone with Exynos 850 SoC in India. This variant can be purchased with 4 GB RAM + 64 GB internal storage and 6 GB RAM + 128 GB internal storage configurations; 4 GB model costs Rs. 13.999 and 6 GB model costs Rs. 16.499.

On 9 August 2021, a new variant of the phone named as Samsung Galaxy A12 Nacho was announced. This variant of the phone is powered by Samsung's in-house Exynos 850 SoC with octa-core CPU and 8 nm process instead of MediaTek Helio P35 SoC and runs on Android 11 out of the box. Aside from these differences, both Galaxy A12 and Galaxy A12 Nacho have almost identical specifications.

As for 2021, the Galaxy A12 is the best-selling and best-shipped smartphone worldwide, shipped about a whopping 51.8 million units and is the only smartphone to cross 50 million in a single model with a single year, outstanding the Samsung Galaxy A21s and Samsung Galaxy A31, and as well as surpassed Apple's iPhone 11, iPhone 12 and iPhone 13 series, along with the Redmi 9 and Redmi 9A. And its smaller sibling, Galaxy A02 made to the top 10 as well.

Specifications

Design 
The Galaxy A12 is available in Black, Blue, White and Red colour options. The four rear-facing cameras are arranged in a square in the top left corner, similar to the camera array of the Galaxy A42 5G. The back and sides are built of plastic, while the front is glass. The physical dimensions of the phone are 6.46 x 2.98 x 0.35 in (164 x 75.8 x 8.9 mm) and the phone weighs .

Hardware 
The Galaxy A12 has a  IPS LCD display with a  pixels resolution, 20:9 aspect ratio, ~85.8% screen-to-body ratio and ~264 ppi pixel density. The phone has 4 different RAM and internal storage configurations: 32 GB/3 GB RAM, 64 GB/4 GB RAM, 128 GB/4 GB RAM, and 128 GB/6 GB RAM. The storage can be expanded by means of a MicroSD card, up to an additional 1 TB. The phone is powered by Mediatek MT6765 Helio P35 SoC with octa-core CPU and 12 nm process. The phone has a 5000 mAh Li-Po non-removable battery that can be fast charged (15 W) through the USB-C port situated between the 3.5 mm headphone jack and the single loudspeaker. The fingerprint sensor is integrated to the power button.

Cameras 
The Samsung Galaxy A12 has 4 rear-facing cameras shaped in a black round square. The main camera is a 48 MP sensor with f/2.0 aperture, 26mm focal length and autofocus. The ultrawide camera is an 8 MP unit with f/2.2 aperture and 123° field of view (FoV). The main camera is capable of video recording up to 1080p at 30 fps. Both the macro camera (for close-up shots) and the depth sensor (for background blur) are 2 MP sensors with f/2.4 aperture. An LED flash is also present to illuminate shots in low light. The front-facing camera has 8 MP resolution and records video up to 1080p at 30 fps.

Software 
The smartphone comes with One UI Core 2.5 over Android 10, preloaded with many standard Google apps. It also comes with Samsung Knox for added security.

See also 
Samsung Galaxy A02
Samsung Galaxy A01
Samsung Galaxy A11

References 

Samsung Galaxy
Mobile phones introduced in 2020
Android (operating system) devices
Samsung smartphones
Mobile phones with multiple rear cameras
Mobile phones with 4K video recording